Room for Rent is a 1996 Philippine romantic comedy film directed by Junn Cabreira. The film stars Emilio Garcia, Stella Ruiz, Raymond Bagatsing and Bernadette Marquez. It is a remake of the 1986 film Dingding Lang ang Pagitan.

Cast
 Emilio Garcia as Peter
 Stella Ruiz as Jessie
 Raymond Bagatsing as Johnny
 Bernadette Marquez as Sandra
 Chariz de Villa as Kirina
 Lito Pimentel as Rey
 Dante Javier as Beerhouse Customer

Production
The film was initially known as Room for Rent: Dingding Lang ang Pagitan. However, the tagline was dropped from its title to avoid legal complications against Ronald Carballo, director of the 1986 film who owns the said tagline.

References

External links

1996 films
1996 romantic comedy films
Filipino-language films
Philippine romantic comedy films
Moviestars Production films